Lopushna may refer to:

 Georgi Damyanovo, village
 Lopushna Monastery, Bulgaria
 Lopushna, Varna Province, Bulgaria
 Lopushna, Chernivtsi Oblast, Ukraine
 Lopushnia - village in Ivano-Frankivsk Oblast, Ukraine